Reikorangi is a rural locality on the Kapiti Coast in New Zealand's North Island.  It is inland, behind Waikanae in the Akatarawa Valley of the Tararua Ranges. The Ngatiawa River and Reikorangi Stream both meet the Waikanae River in Reikorangi. Reikorangi contains a church, a monastery, and formerly contained a school, which closed in 1970 due to the declining population of the small locality.

A historic Howe truss bridge collapsed in 2017.

Attractions include the Reikorangi Pottery Park and Cafe. The national Te Araroa Trail passes also through.

References

Kapiti Coast District
Populated places in the Wellington Region